Megacraspedus consortiella is a moth of the family Gelechiidae. It was described by Aristide Caradja in 1920. It is found in Russia's Alai Mountains.

The forewings are mouse-grey with the costa white from one-third to the apex. The hindwings are mouse-grey.

References

Moths described in 1920
Megacraspedus